The Battery A, 1st West Virginia Light Artillery Regiment was an artillery battery that served in the Union Army during the American Civil War.

Service (from Dyer's Compendium)
Organized at Wheeling, W. Va., and mustered in June 28, 1861. Attached to Army of Occupation, W. Va., to September, 1861. Cheat Mountain, District West Virginia, to January, 1862. Landers' Division, Army Potomac, to March, 1862. Shields' 2nd Division, Banks' 5th Army Corps, and Dept. of the Shenandoah, to May, 1862. Shields' Division, Dept. of the Rappahannock, to June, 1862. Slough's Command, Defenses of Washington, D.C., to February, 1863. Camp Barry, Defenses of Washington, 22nd Army Corps, to July, 1863. Maryland Heights, 2nd Division, Dept. of West Virginia, to December, 1863. 1st Brigade, 1st Division, Army of West Virginia, to April, 1864. Reserve Division, Harper's Ferry, W. Va., to October, 1864. 1st Separate Brigade Dept. of West Virginia, to July, 1865.

SERVICE.--At Elkwater until October, 1861. Operations on Cheat Mountain September 11–17. Action at Cheat Mountain September 11. Cheat Mountain Pass September 12. Point Mountain Turnpike and Elkwater September 12. Greenbrier River October 3–4. At Romney until January, 1862. Expedition to Blue's Gap January 6. Hanging Rock, Blue's Gap, January 7. At Paw Paw Tunnel until March. Advance on Winchester March 7–12. Battle of Kernstown, Winchester, March 22–23. Cedar Mountain March 25. Woodstock April 1. Eden burg April 2. Occupation of Mt. Jackson April 17. March to Fredericksburg May 12–22, and to Front Royal May 25–30. Front Royal May 30. Duty in the Defenses of Washington, D.C., until July, 1863. Ordered to Harper's Ferry, W. Va., thence to Charlestown. Expedition to near New Market November 15–18. Mt. Jackson November 16. Wells' demonstration up the Shenandoah Valley December 10–25. Duty at Harper's Ferry, Charlestown and Martinsburg until May, 1864. At Maryland Heights until October 17. Moved to Parkersburg October 17. Duty at Parkersburg, Charlestown and in the Kanawha Valley until July, 1865. Mustered out July 27, 1865.

Casualties
The 1st West Virginia Light Artillery Regiment lost 33 men, killed and died of wounds; 131 men, died of disease, accident or in prison; total deaths, 164 men. (all 8 batteries)

[Source: Regimental Losses in the American Civil War, 1861–1865, by William F. Fox]

Commander
Cpt John Jenks

References
The Civil War Archive

See also
West Virginia Units in the Civil War
West Virginia in the Civil War

Units and formations of the Union Army from West Virginia
Artillery units and formations of the American Civil War
Military units and formations established in 1861
Military units and formations disestablished in 1865
1861 establishments in Virginia